Three ships of the Royal Fleet Auxiliary have borne the name RFA Reliant:

  was a stores carrier, formerly the civilian London Importer. She was acquired in 1933 and sold in 1948.
  was an air stores support ship, formerly the civilian Somersby. She was acquired in 1957 and scrapped in 1977.
  was a helicopter support ship, formerly the civilian Astronomer. She was acquired in 1983 and sold in 1986.

Royal Fleet Auxiliary ship names